Jefferson County, Arkansas is a county located in the U.S. state of Arkansas in the area known as the Arkansas Delta that extends west of the Mississippi River. Jefferson County consists of five cities, two towns, and 20 townships. The county is bisected by the Arkansas River, which was critical to its development and long the chief transportation byway. In 2020, Jefferson County's population was estimated at 67,260. Its county seat and largest city is Pine Bluff. Jefferson County is included in the Pine Bluff metropolitan statistical area. The county seat and the most populous city is Pine Bluff.

Jefferson County was formed from Vaugine Township, Pulaski County and Richland Township, Arkansas County in the Arkansas Territory, on November 2, 1829. It is named for Thomas Jefferson, third U.S. president. Jefferson County was the site of the Battle of Pine Bluff, occurring on October 25, 1863.

History

The area that would later become Jefferson County was occupied by the Quapaw when French explorers established the Arkansas Post in the 17th century; the foreigners claimed this area as Louisiana, part of New France.

In March 1819, Robert Crittenden was appointed secretary of Arkansas Territory.  That same year, Joseph Bonne, traveling upstream on the Arkansas River from Arkansas Post, built a cabin on a "high bluff covered with pine trees" on the river's south bank. Several years later, James Scull, also from Arkansas Post, established a tavern and small inn on the river's north bank, across from what would become the site of Pine Bluff. Five years later, Crittenden convinced the remaining Quapaw to sign the November 15, 1824 treaty relinquishing what remained of their tribal lands.

Steamboat travel led to expanding settlement, "bringing to the area such men as French-born Napoleonic soldier Antoine Barraque (Pine Bluff's principal east-west street was named for him) and brothers James T. and John Pullen (main thoroughfares were named for them)." On November 2, 1829, Territorial Governor John Pope—Crittenden's successor—approved the establishment of Jefferson County. Bonne's cabin was used as the county seat; by August 1832, "Pine Bluff Town" became the county seat."

The land in the county was developed as large cotton plantations, with fronts on the river for transportation. The plantations were dependent on the labor of enslaved African Americans, who comprised a majority of the population in the county well before the American Civil War. After the war, planters in Jefferson County gradually resumed cotton cultivation and processing. The economy was driven by cotton and the Delta area was highly productive.

In 1886, Jefferson County produced 55,120 bales of cotton, the most in Arkansas, and the second-most throughout the South.  Transportation companies serving the county at the time included the Cotton Belt Route, the St. Louis – San Francisco Railway, Missouri Pacific, the Arkansas River Packet Company, the Wiley Jones Street Car Lines, and the Citizens Street Railway Company.

Geography
The county is located approximately 43 miles (69 km ) southeast of Little Rock,  144 Miles (233 km southwest of Memphis, Tennessee, 218 Miles (351 km ) northwest of Jackson, Mississippi, 135 Miles. The county is  88 Miles (142 km ) northwest Of Mississippi border

Major highways

  Interstate 530
  U.S. Highway 65
  U.S. Highway 79
  U.S. Highway 270
  U.S. Highway 425
  Highway 15
  Highway 31
  Highway 46
  Highway 54
  Highway 81
  Highway 88

Adjacent counties
 Lonoke County (northeast)
 Arkansas County (east)
 Lincoln County (southeast)
 Cleveland County (southwest)
 Grant County (west)
 Pulaski County (northwest)

Demographics

2020 census

As of the 2020 United States census, there were 67,260 people, 27,593 households, and 16,356 families residing in the county.

2010 census
As of the 2010 census, there were 77,435 people living in the county. 55.1% were Black or African American, 42.0% White, 0.8% Asian, 0.3% Native American, 0.7% of some other race and 1.2% of two or more races. 1.6% were Hispanic or Latino (of any race).

2000 census
As of the 2000 census, there were 84,278 people, 30,555 households, and 21,510 families living in the county. There were 34,350 housing units at an average density of 39 per square mile (15/km2). The racial makeup of the county was 49.58% Black or African American, 48.46% White, 0.24% Native American, 0.66% Asian, 0.04% Pacific Islander, 0.26% from other races, and 0.76% from two or more races. 0.96% of the population were Hispanic or Latino of any race. By comparison, the county had 15,714 residents in 1870, 20% of whom were White.

In the county, there were 30,555 households, out of which 33.10% had children under the age of 18 living with them, 47.40% were married couples living together, 18.80% had a female householder with no husband present, and 29.60% were non-families. 26.20% of all households were made up of individuals, and 10.60% had someone living alone who was 65 years of age or older.  The average household size was 2.59 and the average family size was 3.13. The population was spread out, with 26.30% under the age of 18, 10.80% from 18 to 24, 27.80% from 25 to 44, 22.10% from 45 to 64, and 12.90% who were 65 years of age or older.  The median age was 35 years. For every 100 females, there were 95.90 males. For every 100 females age 18 and over, there were 93.40 males.

Jefferson County experienced a decline in population between 2000 and 2010 of 8.1%.  The county has continued to decline in population since 2010, showing a 3.5% decrease in population to 74,723 between the 2010 census and the 2012 (-3.5%) census estimates.

The median income for a household in the county was $31,327, and the median income for a family was $38,252. Males had a median income of $31,848 versus $21,867 for females. The per capita income for the county was $15,417.  About 16.00% of families and 20.50% of the population were below the poverty line, including 29.60% of those under age 18 and 17.80% of those age 65 or over.

Government and infrastructure
The state has built a number of correctional facilities in and near Pine Bluff, and moved the headquarters of the Arkansas Department of Corrections (ADC) to here in 1979. The administrative Annex East is on Harding Avenue in Pine Bluff, south of city hall. The Diagnostic Unit, the Pine Bluff Unit, and the Randall L. Williams Correctional Facility are in the "Pine Bluff Complex" in Pine Bluff. The headquarters of the Arkansas Correctional School system are within the Pine Bluff Complex.

The Arkansas Department of Community Correction Southeast Arkansas Community Corrections Center is in Pine Bluff. The Tucker Unit is also located north of Pine Bluff. Historically the Arkansas Boys' Industrial School and the Arkansas Negro Boys' Industrial School were in the county.

Politics
Jefferson County is strongly Democratic in races for president, governor, and the United States Senate. In the Reconstruction Era, the county's majority black residents favored presidential candidates from the Republican Party in every election from 1868 to 1888. In the early 1890s, white Southern Democrats passed laws to disenfranchise black voters from engaging in the political process, a process which ended by the 1960s, and blacks began to favor voting for Democrats and southern whites favored the Republicans. Since 1892, Democrats have carried the county in all but three presidential elections, when Republican William McKinley won it in 1900, American Independent Party candidate George Wallace won it in 1968 and Republican Richard Nixon won it in 1972, the latter whom carried every county in Arkansas. No Republican since George H. W. Bush in 1988 has won over 40% of the county's vote, although [Joe Biden] is the first Democrat since that year to get under 60% in the county.

In the style of many urban counties in the Barack Obama and post-Obama eras, the Democratic Party continues to enjoy a strong following in Jefferson County, even as the non-urban areas has deeply turned against the party.

Education
School districts serving sections of the county include:
 Pine Bluff School District
 Watson Chapel School District
 White Hall School District
 DeWitt School District (headquartered in another county)

On July 1, 1983, the Plum Bayou School District consolidated into the Wabbaseka Tucker School District. On July 1, 1984, the Linwood School District consolidated into the Pine Bluff school district. The Altheimer-Sherrill School District and Wabbaseka Tucker school districts operated in Jefferson County until September 1, 1993, when they consolidated into the Altheimer Unified School District. On July 1, 2004, the Humphrey School District consolidated into the DeWitt district. Altheimer Unified consolidated into the Dollarway School District on July 10, 2006. Dollarway School District merged into the Pine Bluff district in 2021.

Populated places

Cities
 Altheimer
 Humphrey (mostly in Arkansas County)
 Pine Bluff (county seat)
 Redfield
 White Hall

Towns
 Sherrill
 Wabbaseka

Census-designated places
 Sulphur Springs

Other communities

 Jefferson
 Lake Dick
 Midway
 Moscow
 New Gascony
 Noble Lake
 Reydell
 Sweden
 Tucker
 Wright

Townships

 Barraque (Redfield)
 Bogy
 Bolivar
 Dudley Lake
 Dunnington (Wabbaseka)
 Jefferson
 Melton
 Niven
 Old River
 Pastoria
 Plum Bayou (Altheimer, Sherrill)
 Richland
 Roberts (Humphrey)
 Spring
 Talladega
 Vaugine (Pine Bluff)
 Victoria
 Villemont
 Washington (White Hall)
 Whiteville

Former populated places

 Anrep
 Bruce
 Byrd's Spring
 Clements
 College Park
 Diantha
 Dolton
 Doylestown
 Fairfield
 Faith
 Kratnek
 Lamb
 Lamberts
 Linn
 Noble's Lake
 Plum Bayou
 Ray Station
 Red Bluff
 Samples
 Secrest
 Sleeth
 Walden
 Waldstein

Notable people
 Bobby Hutton (1950-1968), Treasurer of the Black Panther Party
 Bobby King (January 29, 1941 – July 22, 1983), Chicago blues guitarist, singer and songwriter.
 Kemp Toney (1876-1955), politician representing Jefferson County in the Arkansas House of Representatives from 1931 to 1948

See also 
 List of counties in Arkansas
 List of places named for Thomas Jefferson
 National Register of Historic Places listings in Jefferson County, Arkansas

References

Further reading

External links

 Government
 
 General information
 
 Jefferson County, Arkansas at ARGenWeb
 Pine Bluff and Jefferson County Library System
 

 
1829 establishments in Arkansas Territory
Arkansas counties
Arkansas populated places on the Arkansas River
Black Belt (U.S. region)
Majority-minority counties in Arkansas
Pine Bluff metropolitan area
Populated places established in 1829